MeteoSwiss, officially the Federal Office of Meteorology and Climatology, is an office of the federal administration of Switzerland. It employs 290 people at locations in Zurich, Zurich Airport, Geneva, Locarno and Payerne.

History
Originally established as the Central Meteorological Institute (MZA), by 1863 it operated 88 weather stations. Its name was changed in 1979 to Swiss Meteorological Institute (SMA). Since 1996, it has been operating as MeteoSwiss. Since 2006, its official name is "Federal Office of Meteorology and Climatology MeteoSwiss".

Function
The office observes the weather around the clock, creating weather forecasts and alerting authorities and population, when strong winds, heavy rainfall, storms or heat waves are forecast. In addition, it provides weather services for the civil, military and private aviation.

The office also carries out a program of research and development to understand the weather and climate in the Alps. They also officially represent Switzerland at the World Meteorological Organization in Geneva.

See also
 Swiss Federal Institute for Forest, Snow and Landscape Research
 Swiss Seismological Service
 NinJo workstation used by MeteoSwiss

Notes and references

External links
 

Governmental meteorological agencies in Europe
Federal Department of Home Affairs
Federal offices of Switzerland